Janier Alexis Acevedo Calle (born 6 December 1985) is a Colombian professional road racing cyclist, who last rode for UCI Continental team .

Career

2013 season
He subsequently finished third overall in the Tour, and briefly wore the leader's jersey before van Garderen claimed it.

In September 2013, it was announced that Acevedo would move to the  squad for the 2014 season.

Major results
Sources:

2009
 1st  Overall Vuelta Ciclista a Costa Rica
1st Stages 8 (ITT) & 10
2010
 1st Stage 1 (TTT) Vuelta a Colombia
 1st Stage 6 Vuelta a Guatemala
2011
 1st Stage 3 (TTT) Vuelta a Colombia
 1st Stage 4 Tour of Utah
 8th Road race, Pan American Road Championships
2012
 6th Overall Vuelta Mexico
2013
 1st Overall 2012–13 UCI America Tour
 3rd Overall Tour of Utah
 3rd Overall Tour of California
1st Stage 2
 4th Overall USA Pro Cycling Challenge
1st Stage 4
 5th Overall Tour of the Gila
1st Stage 1
 8th Overall Tour de San Luis
2014
 9th Overall Tour of California
 9th Overall Tour de Suisse
2015
 4th GP Miguel Induráin
2016
 3rd Overall Joe Martin Stage Race
1st Stage 1 (ITT)
 4th Overall Tour of the Gila
 8th Overall Tour de San Luis

References

External links

Janier Acevedo: Cycling Base 
Janier Acevedo: Cycling Quotient
Janier Acevedo: Garmin-Sharp

1985 births
Colombian male cyclists
Living people
Sportspeople from Antioquia Department
21st-century Colombian people